Dracaena fernaldii, synonym Pleomele fernaldii, is a species of flowering plant that is endemic to the island of Lānai in Hawaii. It is known by the common name Lanai hala pepe. It is threatened by habitat loss. 400–1000 of these plants remain in the wild, but little recruitment has been observed in the past 10 years. The reasons for the lack of recruitment are unclear.

This is a federally listed endangered species of the United States.

References

External links
World Conservation Monitoring Centre. 1998. Pleomele fernaldii. The IUCN Red List of Threatened Species 1998. Downloaded on 10 September 2015.

fernaldii
Endemic flora of Hawaii
Biota of Lanai
Trees of Hawaii
Plants described in 1947
Taxonomy articles created by Polbot